Helen Margaret Jean Richards (née Mackenzie; 20 April 1930 – 6 August 2018) was a New Zealand swimmer who represented her country at the 1950 Empire Games.

Educated at St Cuthbert's College, Mackenzie won the 440 yards freestyle title, representing Auckland, at the New Zealand national swimming championships in 1950. She went on to represent New Zealand at the 1950 British Empire Games in Auckland in the same event. She recorded a time of 5:47.6 to finish third in her heat and did not progress to the final.

References

1930 births
2018 deaths
Swimmers from Auckland
People educated at St Cuthbert's College, Auckland
New Zealand female swimmers
Swimmers at the 1950 British Empire Games
Commonwealth Games competitors for New Zealand
University of Auckland alumni
New Zealand bacteriologists
New Zealand emigrants to the United States